Died 2022

Jarrick Hillery (born March 29, 1976) is a former American football wide receiver who played eight seasons in the Arena Football League with the Nashville Kats, Georgia Force and Carolina Cobras. He played college football at Tennessee State University.

College career
Hillery played college football for the Tennessee State Tigers. He was a First Team All-Ohio Valley Conference selection his senior year and helped the Tigers to a conference title in 1998. He was also named OVC Specialist of the Week twice his senior year.

Professional career

Nashville Kats
Hillery played for the Nashville Kats from 2000 to 2001, earning First Team All-Arena in 2001.

Georgia Force
Hillery played for the Georgia Force from 2002 to 2003.

Carolina Cobras
Hillery signed with the Carolina Cobras on October 29, 2003. He played for the team during the 2004 season.

Nashville Kats
Hillery was signed by the Nashville Kats on October 11, 2004. He played for the Kats from 2005 to 2006.

Georgia Force
Hillery signed with the Georgia Force on January 19, 2007. He played for the Force during the 2007 season.

References

External links
Just Sports Stats

Living people
1976 births
Players of American football from Georgia (U.S. state)
American football wide receivers
American football defensive backs
African-American players of American football
Tennessee State Tigers football players
Nashville Kats players
Georgia Force players
Carolina Cobras players
People from Brunswick, Georgia